Guatemala participated at the 2018 Summer Youth Olympics in Buenos Aires, Argentina from 6 to 18 October 2018.

Athletics

Beach volleyball

Guatemala qualified a girls' team based on their performance at the 2018 AFECAVOL Zone U19 Championship.

Gymnastics

Artistic
Guatemala qualified one gymnast based on its performance at the 2018 American Junior Championship.

 Girls' artistic individual all-around - 1 quota

Girls

Multidiscipline

Karate

Guatemala qualified one athlete based on its performance at one of the Karate Qualification Tournaments.

 Boys' -61 kg - Pedro de la Roca

Modern pentathlon

Rowing

Guatemala qualified one boat based on its performance at the American Qualification Regatta.

 Girls' single sculls - 1 athlete

Tennis

Singles

Doubles

Weightlifting

References

2018 in Guatemalan sport
Nations at the 2018 Summer Youth Olympics
Guatemala at the Youth Olympics